Vilija Matačiūnaitė (born 24 June 1986) is a Lithuanian singer, actress and songwriter. She represented Lithuania in the 59th annual Eurovision Song Contest 2014 in Copenhagen, Denmark, with her song "Attention".

Career
Matačiūnaitė began her professional career in 2005, when she reached the finals in National Eurovision preselection and finished 7th. In 2005, she achieved wide recognition by participating in the first season of a successful local LNK television music competition franchise Kelias į žvaigždes, where she became the runner-up. In 2010, she finished 2nd on a dance show Kviečiu Šokti and she was third in the international singing competition Sea songs in Ukraine. In 2011, she was the runner-up in the international singing competition Golden voices in Moldova. She was crowned the winner of UK's' music competition Melange Factor in 2012.  In 2013, she won the local LRT television music competition for professional voices Auksinis balsas. She also hosted music TV show Romeo ir Džiuljeta. In 2014, she won the Lithuanian Eurovision national selection with her winning song "Attention".

Eurovision 2014 
Matačiūnaitė represented Lithuania in the Eurovision Song Contest 2014, singing the song "Attention", which she wrote herself. She failed to make it past the second semi final, achieving 11th place.

She received Barbara Dex Award for the worst dressed artist in the 2014.

Eurovision 2017 
In 2017, Matačiūnaitė participated in the national final for the Eurovision Song Contest with the song "I See the Lights" 
but did not go through the first stage of the selection.

Eurovision 2021 and 2022 
Under the artist name Sunday Afternoon, Matačiūnaitė entered Pabandom iš naujo! 2021 in an attempt to represent Lithuania in the Eurovision Song Contest 2021 with the song "Open". She failed to qualify from the semi-finals. She returned to Pabandom iš naujo! in 2022 to try for a fourth time to represent Lithuania in the Eurovision Song Contest 2022 with the song "101", where she finished in sixth place in the second semi-final of the competition.

Discography

Albums

Singles

Filmography

References 

1986 births
Living people
Musicians from Vilnius
21st-century Lithuanian women singers
English-language singers from Lithuania
Lithuanian child actresses
Lithuanian television actresses
Eurovision Song Contest entrants for Lithuania
Eurovision Song Contest entrants of 2014
Articles containing video clips
21st-century Lithuanian actresses
Actresses from Vilnius
Lithuanian women television presenters